The hwamei has been split into two species:
 Chinese hwamei, Garrulax canorus
 Taiwan hwamei, Garrulax taewanus

Birds by common name